The Great Wall Voleex C10 is a supermini car manufactured by the Chinese company Great Wall Motors between 2010 and 2013. Also known as the Great Wall Phenom, the C10 features a distinctive front grille design, but shares many visual similarities with the Toyota Vitz. A more restrained grille is available in some markets.

Overview
It is exported to the Middle East  and Ukraine as the Voleex C10 with a scheduled Australian release date of 2012. It was announced that the C10 would also be exported to Britain by 2011 and sold in Daihatsu dealerships, but no on-sale date was formally announced.

The C10 is produced in 1.3 L (1298cc) and 1.5 L (1497cc) 4-cylinder petrol engined versions.

Great Wall Voleex C20R
The C20R is the crossover version of the C10. That later spawned the second generation Haval H1 crossover.

Gallery

References

External links

Official website (archived)

Voleex C10
Cars introduced in 2010
2010s cars
Cars of China